WJPZ-FM is a radio station in Syracuse, New York.  It broadcasts at 89.1 FM at an effective radiated power of 1,000 watts and can be heard throughout Syracuse, the rest of Onondaga County, and beyond to the north and east. WJPZ primarily programs a Top 40 (CHR) radio format. A notable amount of airtime during the academic year is devoted to sports talk and live play-by-play coverage of select local sporting events.

Ownership
Although operated by students, it is an independent organization which is incorporated and licensed by the FCC as WJPZ Radio, Inc and leases studio and transmitter facilities on Syracuse University property. WJPZ broadcasts 14 hours of sports talk radio and provides game broadcasts for Central New York high school football, Syracuse Orange women's basketball, and Syracuse women's lacrosse.

History
WJPZ was founded by a group of Syracuse University students including Craig Fox and Bill Blyley in late 1972. The unlicenced station initially broadcast with a power of one-tenth of a watt, and played Top 40 hits at 12.00 AM. The makeshift studio was located in the attic of a building at 100 Waverly Ave. which housed a campus record store. According to one story, the call letters of WJPZ were chosen because the students liked call letter rhyme scheme for WABC in New York City, while Bill Blyley has maintained that the letters were chosen at random.

After construction of Newhouse 2 building in 1972, university-supported WAER radio moved into a brand new facility and discarded equipments it had been using since 1946. These discarded cheap turntables and old parts were salvaged by Fox and Blyley. WAER was more academically focussed and students wanting freedom to learn and know other aspects tuned in. In 1974, WJPZ moved to a new location in the basement of 821 University Ave (now the Sheraton Hotel). The station branded itself as WJPZ 1200 ZRock “Non-Stop Rock,” playing a “tasteful blend of Top 40 music and popular album cuts” for a college-age audience 24 hours a day. However, the station was not a fully recognized student organization, and did not have a license because the station's low-powered signal was permitted under Part 15 of the FCC’s rules.  The station eventually started selling ads to local businesses, which caused tension with competitors like WNDR (1260 AM). The FCC eventually took notice and contacted Syracuse University, but ultimately allowed the station to continue broadcasting as long as its signal stayed within limits. The university wanted a faculty advisor for the station and suggested Dr. Roosevelt “Rick” Wright Jr. Wright became the station's biggest champion and helped it grow into a successful student-run and operated radio station.

In 1985, the station rebranded Z89 when it switched to FM and was authorized to broadcast at 100 watts of effective radiated power. With the WAER moving to be an affiliated with National Public Radio and the Corporation for Public Broadcasting, and becoming more of a public radio station, the Student Government Association encouraged WJPZ to move to the FM dial. At the time, it was the first and only student-owned and operated FM station in the country. 

In the Fall of 1997, WJPZ was placed into receivership for several different reasons, but it survived. In 2001, the station moved into a house off campus over on Ostrom Ave. and finally settled into the Menchel Media Center inside the Watson Hall in the Fall of 2001 where it is still housed.

As of June 29, 2017, the station started broadcasting at 1,000 watts with approval from the Federal Communications Commission.

Currently WJPZ broadcasts as part of Syracuse University's student media organization. The WJPZ Alumni Association organized events and curates a Hall of Fame wall.

Greatest Media Classroom & WJPZ at 50 
In 2014, WJPZ alumnus Scott MacFarlane produced Greatest Media Classroom documentary  film to chronicle the 40-year history of WJPZ. The film showcased the students' ambition and self-reliance in creating and running the station, as well as their ability to handle tragic events such as the Pan Am Flight 103 tragedy in 1988. It was commissioned by the WJPZ Alumni Association.

In 2023, a new podcast "WJPZ at 50" was created and produced by WJPZ to mark the station's 50th anniversary. It consists of 50 episodes. Hosted by  Jon "JAG" Gay, a Class of 2002 alumnus, the podcast featured interviews with current and former staffers about their experiences at SU and the station. Notable guests included CBS News Correspondent Scott MacFarlane and ESPN Radio's Mike Couzens, as well as business owners and communicators from the radio industry.

References

External links

 
WJPZ at 50 Podcast

JPZ-FM
Rhythmic contemporary radio stations in the United States
JPZ-FM
Syracuse University
Radio stations established in 1974
1974 establishments in New York (state)